The European Parliament election of 2019 took place in Italy on 26 May 2019.

In Sicily the Five Star Movement came first with 31.2% of the vote (+14.1pp than at country-level), ahead of the League (20.8%; –13.5pp), Forza Italia (17.0%; +8.2pp), the Democratic Party (16.6; –6.1pp), Brothers of Italy (7.6%; +1.1pp), More Europe (1.9%), Green Europe (1.5%) and The Left (1.2%).

Results

References

Elections in Sicily
European Parliament elections in Italy
2019 European Parliament election
2019 elections in Italy